Pramadea ovialis is a moth in the family Crambidae that is found in subtropical eastern and southern Africa, including islands of the Indian Ocean. The species has also been recorded from West Africa.

References

Moths described in 1856
Moths of Africa
Spilomelinae
Taxa named by Francis Walker (entomologist)